Nguyễn Thị Tuyết Ngân (born 10 February 2000) is a Vietnamese footballer who plays as a forward for Women's Championship club Hồ Chí Minh City I and the Vietnam women's national team.

International goals

References

External links

2000 births
Living people
Women's association football forwards
Vietnamese women's footballers
People from Long An Province
Vietnam women's international footballers
21st-century Vietnamese women